Riama simotera, O'Shaughnessy's lightbulb lizard, is a species of lizard in the family Gymnophthalmidae. It is endemic to Ecuador.

References

Riama
Reptiles of Ecuador
Endemic fauna of Ecuador
Reptiles described in 1879
Taxa named by Arthur William Edgar O'Shaughnessy